John Castagnini (born December 3, 1970) is an ontologist, public speaker on consciousness, and publisher of the best-selling "Thank God i" series of self-help books.

Castagnini has appeared in several movies, including the spiritual documentary Discover the Gift, co-starring with spiritual leaders The Dalai Lama and Sri Sri Ravi Shankar, as well as international relationship author Barbara De Angelis.

Biography 
Born in Canarsie, Brooklyn, New York as the eldest of three sons, Castagnini obtained a B.A degree in Biology from Cal-State Fullerton.  Prompted by the death of his mother in 2005, Castagnini went on to found the "ThankGodi" publication, which focuses on methods of "equilibration" as a means to come to terms with traumatic personal events, and features well known authors John Demartini, Dr. Wayne Dyer and Dr. Bernie Seigel.  The experiences that contributed to this approach of counselling were detailed in the documentary Discover the Gift, and on ABC's show A View from the Bay with Spencer Christian.

Works

Books 
 2001 - Treasures Within: Meditation with a Friend - (co-authored with Halley Elise) - 1st Book Library , 
 2005 - Making Love with Poetry - AuthorHouse , 
 2008 - Thank God I - Vol. 1 - (editor) Inspired Authors , 
 2009 - Thank God I - Vol. 2 - (editor) Inspired Authors , 
 2011 - How to Say "I Love You" in Every Language - (editor) Inspired Authors , 
 2012 - Thank God I ... Am an Empowered Woman - (editor) - Inspired Authors , 
 2012 - Thank God I - Vol. 3 - Inspired Authors (editor)

Television, Movies and Appearances 
 2007 - View from the Bay - ABC
 2008 - The Fairmont Conference
 2012 - Discover the Gift - Random House

References

External links 
 Official website
 ThankGodI website
 Huffington Post Interview

1970 births
American self-help writers
Living people
Ontologists
American health and wellness writers
American motivational speakers
American spiritual writers
People from Canarsie, Brooklyn
California State University, Fullerton alumni